José António da Fonseca Vieira da Silva (born 14 February 1953) is a Portuguese politician and a member of the Socialist Party. He served as Minister of Solidarity, Employment and Social Security from 2015 to 2019 under Prime Minister António Costa.

References

1953 births
Living people
Government ministers of Portugal
Economy ministers of Portugal
Labour ministers of Portugal
Socialist Party (Portugal) politicians
People from Leiria